The Town of Normanton is a former local government area for the town of Normanton in North Queensland, Australia. It existed from 1886 to 1910.

History 

On 6 February 1886, the Borough of Normanton was constituted separately as a municipality for the emerging town of Normanton. Its first elections held on 13 April 1886.

With the passage of the Local Authorities Act 1902, the Borough of Hughenden became the Town of Hughenden on 31 March 1903.

On 8 January 1910, the Town of Normanton was abolished and absorbed into the Shire of Carpentaria.

Mayors
 1888: R. G. Shanklin
1889: Major Colless
1890: H.B. Raffety
1891: Mr. Valkenburg
1892: Mr. Hely
1893: Alderman Lawrence
1894: Mr. R. Robinson
1898,
1904: Mr. S. Mathers
1905, 1906, 1908: Mr. Rowland Robinson

1907: Mr. Mathers, (Proprietor of the Norman Chronicle)

1909, 1910, 1911 - : James Robert Butteris

References

External links
 

Former local government areas of Queensland
1886 establishments in Australia
1910 disestablishments in Australia